Abington Township is one of fifteen townships in Wayne County, Indiana, United States. As of the 2010 census, its population was 853 and it contained 366 housing units.

History
Abington Township was formed in 1837.

Geography
Lakes in this township include Elkhorn Lakes. The streams of Elkhorn Creek, Locust Creek and Smith Creek run through this township.

Unincorporated towns
 Abington at 
(This list is based on USGS data and may include former settlements.)

Adjacent townships
 Center Township (north)
 Boston Township (east)
 Harrison Township, Union County (southeast)
 Brownsville Township, Union County (south)
 Waterloo Township, Fayette County (southwest)
 Washington Township (west)

Cemeteries
The township contains one cemetery, Locust Grove.

Major highways
 U.S. Route 27

Airports and landing strips
 Squires Airport

References
 
 United States Census Bureau cartographic boundary files

Specific

External links
 Indiana Township Association
 United Township Association of Indiana

Townships in Wayne County, Indiana
Townships in Indiana